Agrotis interjectionis is a moth of the family Noctuidae. It is found in the Northern Territory of Australia, Malaysia and from Sumatra, Java and Sulawesi to Vanuatu.

The larvae are considered a pest on a wide range of tropical crops in South-East Asia, including Saccharum officinarum, Zea mays, Elaeis guineensis, Nicotiana tabacum, Arachis hypogaea, Sesamum, Hibiscus sabdariffa, Gossypium and Allium.

External links
Australian Faunal Directory

Agrotis
Moths of Australia
Moths of Asia
Moths described in 1852